Colours is the debut album by Graffiti6 originally released in 2010 on N.W. Free Music. It was re-released in 2012 on the label Capitol Records for wider distribution.

Track listing

2010 N.W. Free Music release
All tracks written by Jamie Scott / TommyD compositions except for "Stare into the Sun" that is a Scott/Danvers/Woodford composition)
"Stone in My Heart" (3:08) 
"Annie You Save Me" (3:42)
"Stare Into the Sun" (3:56)
"This Man" (5:42)
"Free" (4:42)
"Calm The Storm" (5:32) 
"Colours" (5:17)
"Goodbye Geoffrey Drake" (4:16) 
"Never Look Back" (3:27)
"Stop Mary" (3:50)
"Lay Me Down" (4:14) 
"Over You" (4:29)

2012 N.W. Free Music/Capitol Records release

The joint rerelease contains the same track list in addition to bonus tracks
 "Starlight" (3:30)
 "Love Don't Conquer Me" (3:54)
 "Stare Into the Sun" (Stripped) (3:23)
 "Free" (Stripped) (4:47)

Charts
The album reached number 85 on the US Billboard 200 albums chart. The album also charted in the Netherlands where it reached number 32 in the Dutch Albums Chart.

References

2010 albums